Corning is a city in Tehama County, California, that is located about  south of Red Bluff and about  north of Sacramento. The population was 8,244 at the 2020 census, up from 7,663 at the 2010 census.

History
Corning had its start in 1882, when the railroad was extended to that point. The community was named after John Corning, a railroad official.

Geography
Corning is located at  (39.926182, -122.180489).

Climate
According to the Köppen Climate Classification system, Corning has a Hot-summer Mediterranean climate, abbreviated "Csa" on climate maps.

Demographics

2010
At the 2010 census Corning had a population of 7,663 people. The population density was 2,158.8 people per square mile (833.5/km). The racial makeup of Corning was 5,510 (71.9%) White, 44 (0.6%) African American, 201 (2.6%) Native American, 82 (1.1%) Asian, 11 (0.1%) Pacific Islander, 1,496 (19.5%) from other races, and 319 (4.2%) from two or more races. Hispanic or Latino of any race were 3,271 individuals (42.7%).

The census reported that 7,638 people (99.7% of the population) lived in households, 19 (0.2%) lived in non-institutionalized group quarters, and 6 (0.1%) were institutionalized.

There were 2,630 households, out of which 1,193 (45.4%) had children under age 18 living in them, 1,136 (43.2%) were opposite-sex married couples living together, 533 (20.3%) had a female householder with no husband present, 179 (6.8%) had a male householder with no wife present. There were 224 (8.5%) unmarried opposite-sex partnerships, and 12 (0.5%) same-sex married couples or partnerships. 633 households (24.1%) were one person and 259 (9.8%) had someone living alone who was 65 years of age or older. The average household size was 2.90. There were 1,848 families (70.3% of households); the average family size was 3.44 persons.

The age distribution was 2,479 people (32.4%) under age 18, 864 people (11.3%) aged 18 to 24, 1,931 people (25.2%) aged 25 to 44, 1,617 people (21.1%) aged 45 to 64, and 772 people (10.1%) who were 65 years of age or older. The median age was 29.2 years. For every 100 females there were 94.5 males. For every 100 females aged 18 and over, there were 89.5 males.

There were 2,871 housing units at an average density of 808.8 per square mile (312.3/km), of which 1,302 (49.5%) were owner-occupied, and 1,328 (50.5%) were occupied by renters. The homeowner vacancy rate was 3.1%; the rental vacancy rate was 8.4%. 3,765 people (49.1% of the population) lived in owner-occupied housing units and 3,873 people (50.5%) lived in rental housing units.

2000
At the 2000 census there were 6,741 people, 2,422 households, and 1,642 families in the city. The population density was 2,320.3 people per square mile (894.4/km). There were 2,614 housing units at an average density of 899.8 per square mile (346.8/km).  The racial makeup of the city was 74.48% White, 0.52% African American, 2.18% Native American, 0.53% Asian, 0.09% Pacific Islander, 17.42% from other races, and 4.78% from two or more races. Hispanic or Latino of any race were 50.82%.

There were 2,422 households, 40.2% had children under the age of 18 living with them, 45.1% were married couples living together, 16.3% had a female householder with no husband present, and 32.2% were non-families. 26.9% of households were one person and 14.0% had someone living alone who was 65 years of age or older. The average household size was 2.76 and the average family size was 3.33 individuals.

The age distribution was 32.5% under age 18, 10.0% aged 18 to 24, 28.0% aged 25 to 44, 17.7% aged 45 to 64, and 11.8% aged 65 years or older. The median age was 31 years. For every 100 females there were 92.9 males. For every 100 females aged 18 and over, there were 90.5 males.

The median income for a household in the city was $25,357, and the median family income  was $32,151. Males had a median income of $30,563 versus $19,736 for females. The per capita income for the city was $12,357.  About 21.1% of families and 26.3% of the population were below the poverty line, including 33.6% of those under age 18 and 15.6% of those aged 65 or over.

These compare to the national median household income of $45,135 and national per capita income of $23,201; 69.4% of the residents in the city have graduated from high school or achieved further education, compared to 80.35% nationally.

Government

Major industries

The major local industry is growing and preparing table olives. Corning also has a significant agricultural industry based on olive oil, dried plums (prunes, including the Sunsweet label), walnuts, and almonds.
Bell-Carter Foods
Corning is home to Bell-Carter Foods, Inc., the second-largest table olive processor in the world and the largest in the United States. Bell Carter produces Lindsay Olives.

Lucero Olive Oil
North America's most award-winning extra virgin olive oil company, Lucero Olive Oil, is based in Corning, with orchards, an olive mill, a bottling facility, and a public tasting room.

Other local destinations & landmarks
Rodgers Theater, a restored historic cinema building
Corning Museum
Rolling Hills Casino
The Corning Equestrian Center
The Olive Pit, a popular tourist stop since 1967 that specializes in many varieties of table olives, with olive tasting, a wine bar, and a cafe

Corning Olive Festival

The annual Corning Olive Festival, held on the second Saturday in October, is the longest-running olive festival in the United States. Started in 1946 by the local Catholic church as a fundraiser, the festival is now organized and operated by the Corning Chamber of Commerce.

Transportation
Interstate 5 and Highway 99 both serve Corning, along with the California Northern Railroad. The California Northern has been leasing and operating the  line between Davis and Tehama through Corning from Southern Pacific (now Union Pacific) since September 26, 1993. The line was built by Southern Pacific's subsidiary, the Northern Railway Company, in August / September 1882.

Corning Municipal Airport (0O4), a public-use facility, is located just to the north of the high school. The airport was activated in 1940. Its area control center is Oakland Center, while its flight service station is Rancho Murieta.

Notable people 
Mark Acre, former Major League Baseball pitcher
Clair Engle, U.S. Senator
Ralph Goings, American artist
Lee Grissom, Major League Baseball pitcher
Tyler Reddick, 2018 & 2019 NASCAR Xfinity Series champion
Mark Risley, Emmy-winning director
France Silva, Medal of Honor recipient, veteran of the Boxer Rebellion
Jeff Stover, NFL player
Blaire White, YouTube personality

References

External links

TehamaPulse.com is an events calendar for Tehama County, including Corning, CA.

Incorporated cities and towns in California
Cities in Tehama County, California
1882 establishments in California
Populated places established in 1882